The CCNY point-shaving scandal of 1950–51 was a college basketball point-shaving gambling scandal that involved seven American schools in all, with four in the New York metropolitan area, two in the Midwest, and one in the South. However, most of the key players in the scandal were players of the 1949–50 CCNY Beavers men's basketball team.

Background
The cheating began with the National Collegiate Athletic Association (NCAA) and National Invitation Tournament (NIT) champion City College of New York (CCNY). CCNY had won the 1950 NCAA Men's Division I Basketball Tournament and the 1950 National Invitation Tournament over Bradley University. The scandal involved CCNY and at least six other schools, including three others in the New York City area: New York University, Long Island University (LIU) and Manhattan College, spreading to Bradley University in Peoria, Illinois; the University of Kentucky and the University of Toledo, involving 33 players in all, as well as organized crime. CCNY was eventually banned from playing at Madison Square Garden although the coach, Nat Holman, was cleared of any wrongdoing.

Discovery of the scandal
Junius Kellogg, a standout  Manhattan College center, was offered a $1,000 bribe to shave points before a game against DePaul. Although he was working for minimum wage (then 75¢ per hour) at a frozen custard shop near campus, Kellogg refused to take the money and reported the solicitation to his coach, Ken Norton. Norton sent him to New York City District Attorney Frank Hogan. To obtain evidence about the corruption, Kellogg wore a wire when he was again approached in a nearby bar. 

The scandal first became public when Hogan arrested seven men on charges of conspiring to fix games on February 18, 1951. Among those taken into custody were All-America forward Ed Warner, center Ed Roman, and guard Al Roth, the three stars of CCNY's five that won both the NIT and NCAA tournaments, still the only such double championship in history (and destined to remain such, since teams are no longer allowed to enter both tournaments in the same year). The police had set up an undercover operation. The arrests were made in Penn Station when the players returned from Philadelphia, after CCNY had defeated Temple University, 95–71. 

In all, 32 players from seven colleges admitted to taking bribes between 1947 and 1950 to fix 86 games in 17 states. Jack Molinas was not caught in 1951, but after he was suspended for gambling by the National Basketball Association (NBA) he was linked back to the 1951 scandal by bets placed on his then-college team, Columbia University.

Aftermath
The scandal had long-lasting effects for some of the individuals involved, as well as college basketball itself. Long after the scandal was over, coaches would warn their players what could happen to their lives if they chose to make some "fast money".

While Kentucky was forced to cancel one season of play (1952–53), it was the only program that was not permanently hobbled by the scandal. To date, Bradley is the only other affected school to have appeared in a final major media poll. However, none of the programs would suffer more than CCNY and LIU. Following the discovery of several other irregularities, CCNY deemphasized its athletic program and dropped down to what is now Division III. LIU shut down its entire athletic program from 1951 to 1957, and did not return to Division I until the 1980s.

Documentaries 

In 1998, George Roy and Steven Hilliard Stern, Black Canyon Productions, and HBO Sports made a documentary film about the CCNY Point Shaving Scandal, City Dump: The Story of the 1951 CCNY Basketball Scandal, that appeared on HBO.

The story is also detailed in The First Basket, a 2008 documentary covering the history of Jewish players in basketball.

Pop culture references
The scandal is referenced in the HBO series The Sopranos during the episode "Rat Pack", which was the second episode of the fifth season, first broadcast on March 14, 2004. After learning of the death of New York mob boss Carmine Lupertazzi, Corrado "Junior" Soprano confirms that Lupertazzi invented point shaving for "CCNY versus Kentucky, 1951. Nobody beat the spread. I bought a black Fleetwood."

Jay Neugeboren's 1966 novel Big Man is based on what happens to an All-American African American basketball star five years after he was caught in this scandal.

A 1951 movie, The Basketball Fix, was based on the scandal.

See also 
 Sherman White – a player for the Long Island University men's basketball team who was indicted and jailed for participating in this scandal.
 Irwin Dambrot
 Floyd Layne
 Norm Mager
 Ed Roman
 Alvin Roth
 Ed Warner
 Head Coach Nat Holman
 Alex Groza

References

Further reading

External links
"Whereabouts Of The 1950 City College Of New York Team, NIT and NCAA Champs (Part I)". Lost Lettermen. March 11, 2010.
Berkow, Ira (March 29, 1996). 1998 "Final Four: A Look Back; Scandal, the Unwanted Scar of Triumph". New York Times.

1950–51 NCAA men's basketball season
1950 in New York City
1951 in New York City
Academic scandals
Bradley Braves men's basketball
College basketball controversies in the United States
Match fixing
CCNY Beavers men's basketball
History of college basketball in the United States
Kentucky Wildcats men's basketball
LIU Brooklyn Blackbirds men's basketball
Manhattan Jaspers basketball
NCAA sanctions
NYU Violets men's basketball
Sports betting scandals
Toledo Rockets men's basketball
1950s crimes in New York City